Revefenacin, sold under the brand name Yupelri, is a medication for the treatment of chronic obstructive pulmonary disease (COPD). It was approved for use in the United States in 2018. It was developed by Theravance Biopharma and is marketed by Mylan. Revefenacin is formulated as a solution that is nebulized and inhaled.

Revefenacin is a bronchodilator that exerts its effect as a long-acting muscarinic antagonist.

References

External links 
 

Drugs acting on the respiratory system
Piperidines
Benzamides
Carbamates
Biphenyls
Bronchodilators
Muscarinic antagonists